Olga Grey (born Anushka Zacsek or Anna Zacsek, November 10, 1896 – April 25, 1973) was an American silent film actress, sometimes billed with the alternate spelling of her last name, Olga Gray.

She was born in New York city to Hungarian immigrants.  Her father wanted her to become a violinist, so she studied music while harboring dreams of being an actress. She appeared in some amateur productions before joining a Little Theatre in Los Angeles. Her success there paved the way for her work in films.

By her late teens, she was pursuing an acting career in Hollywood. She began working as an extra. Her first film appearance was in the 1915 film His Lesson, in which she had the lead role. She would have twelve film roles that year, including a role (as the actress Laura Keene) in the now classic and controversial film The Birth of a Nation, starring Lillian Gish, Mae Marsh, and directed by D. W. Griffith.

In 1916 she appeared in seven films, including the role of "Lady Agnes" in Macbeth. She would have another eleven roles between 1917 and 1920, with a steady decline of quality roles.

In 1920 she married film actor Arnold Gregg (real name: Arnold Ray Samberg). She later became an attorney under her original name, Anna Zacsek, passing the California bar in 1932.  In 1942 she was one of the defense attorneys in the "Sleepy Lagoon" trials, defending gang members Henry Leyvas, Victor Segobia, and Edward Grandpré. She was the only woman attorney in the courtroom for these trials.

Anna Zacsek was residing in Los Angeles at the time of her death on April 25, 1973, aged 76.

Filmography

References

External links

1896 births
1973 deaths
American film actresses
American silent film actresses
Actresses from Budapest
People from Greater Los Angeles
20th-century American actresses
20th-century American lawyers